There was also a Caucasian Albanian Catholicos Nerses III, who ruled in 1235–1262.

Nerses III the Builder ( Nerses 3 Shinogh) was the Catholicos of the Armenian Apostolic Church between 641 and 661. He was originally from the village of Ishkhan in Tayk. He ruled at a troubled time during which Armenia had to choose between their neighbors Byzantines and Persians along with their new conquerors the Arabs.  

Catholicos Nerses III received the title of the Builder due to the grand construction works he undertook during his reign. The most important ones were the construction of a chapel over the pit of imprisonment of St. Gregory the Illuminator at Khor Virap (which was replaced a thousand years later by the current church) and the magnificent cathedral of Zvartnots. One tradition says he might have been buried on the northern side of the church. Lesser works include the Agarak monastery.

Catholicoi of Armenia
Nerses III the Builder
Doctors of the Church
Year of birth unknown
7th-century Oriental Orthodox archbishops

7th-century Armenian people